The 1999 Manenberg tornado was a rare tornado that occurred in the Cape Town neighborhood of Manenberg, South Africa killing five people on  the night of 29 August 1999.  Wind speeds were recorded reaching over 150 km per hour.  The tornado killed five people and injured an additional 220. Over 5,000 residents were left homeless with 40 flats being "totally gutted".  R1 million (roughly equivalent to R2.6 million in 2017) was allocated by City of Cape Town's disaster relief fund for rebuilding.

See also
 List of tornado outbreaks

References

F0 and F1 tornadoes
Tornadoes of 1999
Tornadoes in South Africa
1999 in South Africa